CSS North Carolina was a casemate ironclad built for the Confederate Navy in 1863 during the American Civil War by Berry & Brothers at Wilmington, North Carolina at a cost of $76,000. She was placed in commission during the latter part of the year with Commander W. T. Muse, CSN, in command.

There were two shuttered gun ports on each of her four casemate sides, and she carried six 8-inch cannons that could be rolled on their carriages from one port to another; she mounted one heavy pivot-rifle in the bow cannon position.

North Carolina was discovered to be structurally unsound and unsuitable for use on the open ocean; her hull had become riddled with shipworm as a result of the green hull timber used for her construction. She remained in the Cape Fear River, where she had developed bad leaks, until she finally foundered on 27 September 1864, just off Smithville (modern Southport); she was serving there as a guard ship.

Her sister ship  was also a hard-luck ironclad. After serving in the Confederate Navy for just one week, Raleigh ran heavily aground on a sandbar called "the Rip." Her tonnage bore down heavily on the ship's unsupported aft keel, the pressure finally "breaking her back," as the tide receded; the ironclad was declared a total loss and her cannon, iron armor, and steam power plant were salvaged.

References

Notes

Bibliography
 
 
 
 
 

Ironclad warships of the Confederate States Navy
Shipwrecks in rivers
Shipwrecks of the Carolina coast
Shipwrecks of the American Civil War
Ships built in Wilmington, North Carolina
1863 ships
Maritime incidents in September 1864